Vadim L'vovich Berezinskii (July 15, 1935 in Kyiv – June 23, 1980 in Moscow) was a Soviet physicist. He was born in Kyiv, graduated from Moscow State University in 1959, and worked in Moscow and the Landau Institute for Theoretical Physics. He is famous for having identified the role played by topological defects in the low-temperature phase of two-dimensional systems with a continuous symmetry. His work led to the discovery of the Berezinskii–Kosterlitz–Thouless transition, for which John M. Kosterlitz and David J. Thouless were awarded the Nobel Prize in 2016. He also developed a technique for treating electrons in one-dimensional disordered systems and provided first consistent proof of one-dimensional localization, and predicted negative-gap superconductivity.

See also
Mermin–Wagner–Berezinskii theorem

References

 

1935 births
1980 deaths
Soviet physicists
Scientists from Kyiv